Peter Monau (Lat. “Petrus Monavius”) (9 April 1551 – 12 May 1588) was a court physician of Emperor Rudolph II.

He was the son of Stenzel Monau and younger brother of Jakob Monau. After several years of humanistic studies in Wittenberg and Heidelberg, he devoted himself from 1575 to 1578 to medical studies in Padua. Having earned his doctorate in Basel with Felix Platter with the work De dentium affectibus (the first doctoral theses in stomatology), he settled in Breslau as physician. In 1580, he was named imperial physician (Archiater Caesareus) by Rudolf II on the recommendation of Johannes Crato von Krafftheim. 

He carried out a correspondence with the Heidelberg Orientalist Jakob Christmann and Augsburg Rector David Hoeschel to 1584. He also corresponded with the Heidelberg and Basel medical professor Thomas Erastus.  He died in Prague.

Publications 
 Consiliorum et epistolarum medicinalium liber; Frankfurt, 1591, with Johannes Crato von Krafftheim
 De dentium affectibus theses inaugurales. Basel, 1578 (VD 16 M 6140).

References

External links 
 
  Digitized Works of Peter Monau at the Munich Digitization Center
 Melchior Adam:  Vitae Germanorum medicorum. 1620

1551 births
1588 deaths
Physicians from Wrocław
16th-century German physicians
16th-century German writers
16th-century German male writers